James D. Brosnahan (born 1963) is a former Democratic member of the Illinois House of Representatives, representing the 36th District from 1997 to 2010.  The district includes all or parts of Oak Lawn, Evergreen Park, Chicago Ridge, Hometown, Palos Hills, and Chicago's 18th, 19th, and 21st wards. He retired from the House and was replaced in March 2010 by Michael J. Carberry.

External links
 Illinois General Assembly - Representative James D. Brosnahan (D) 36th District official IL House website
 Bills Committees
 Project Vote Smart - Representative James D. 'Jim' Brosnahan (IL) profile
 Follow the Money - James D. Brosnahan
 2006 2004 2002 2000 1998 1996 campaign contributions
 Illinois House Democrats - Jim Brosnahan profile

1963 births
Living people
Democratic Party members of the Illinois House of Representatives
21st-century American politicians
People from Evergreen Park, Illinois